Tom Kristensen (born 7 July 1967) is a Danish former racing driver. He holds the record for the most wins at the 24 Hours of Le Mans with nine, six of which were consecutive (from 2000 to 2005). In 1997, he won the race with the Joest Racing team, driving a Tom Walkinshaw Racing-designed and Porsche-powered WSC95, after being a late inclusion in the team following Davy Jones' accident that eventually ruled him out of the race. All of his subsequent wins came driving an Audi prototype, except in 2003, when he drove a Bentley prototype. In both 1999 and 2007 Kristensen's team crashed out of comfortable leads in the closing hours of the race. He is considered by many to be the greatest driver ever to have raced in the 24 Hours of Le Mans. Elsewhere Kristensen also holds the record for most wins at the 12 Hours of Sebring with a total of six.

In August 2014, Kristensen was appointed Knight of the Order of the Dannebrog by the Queen of Denmark. In January 2018 he was inducted into the Danish Sports Hall of Fame.

Career
Kristensen was born in Hobro. His career began in 1984, winning several karting titles. He raced in Japan in the early 1990s, concurrently in Formula 3 and Touring Cars. He was German Formula 3 Champion in 1991, Japanese Formula 3 champion in 1993, and runner-up in the Japanese Touring Car Championship (JTCC) in 1992 and 1994. He was 6th in Formula 3000 in both 1996 and 1997, and test driver for Tyrrell in their final Formula One season in 1998, and for Michelin as they prepared their F1 tyres using an older Williams car in 2000. He was 3rd in the STW Cup in Germany in 1999, 7th in the British Touring Car Championship in 2000, and winner of the 12 Hours of Sebring in both those years.

On 22 April 2007, Kristensen was involved in an accident while racing on the Hockenheimring race course in Hockenheim, Germany. The crash resulted in a long break from training for Kristensen, and his participation in the 2007 Le Mans race was in jeopardy. However, Kristensen recuperated quickly, and was cleared by the Le Mans doctors to start the race. It was reported that a new type of collar may have prevented him suffering a broken neck in the crash.

24 Hours of Le Mans

In 2000, 2001, and 2002, he won the 24 Hours at Le Mans race with the Audi R8 along with Frank Biela and Emanuele Pirro, becoming the first three drivers since Jacky Ickx in 1977 to win the race on three straight occasions. In 2003, he won the race with Bentley. In 2004, he equalled Ickx's record of six Le Mans victories in Team Goh's Audi R8. 2005 saw Kristensen win a seventh time with an American R8 entry, making him the most successful driver at the Le Mans 24-hour race (Ickx left a message on Kristensen's answering machine congratulating him on breaking his record). The 2006 race saw Kristensen finishing in third place in the new diesel-powered Audi R10. Kristensen did not finish the 2007 race following Rinaldo Capello's crash while the car was leading the race by four laps. Kristensen returned in 2008 to claim an eighth victory and extend the record for most wins. In 2013, he took his ninth victory at the event, extending his record and legendary status even further. Also he has received nickname "Mr Le Mans" because of the record of winning Le Mans 9 times total.

On 19 November 2014, Kristensen announced at a press conference in Copenhagen that he was retiring from motorsport at the end of the current World Endurance Championship season.

Racing record

Complete 24 Hours of Le Mans results

Complete 12 Hours of Sebring results

Complete Petit Le Mans results

Complete International Formula 3000 results
(key) (Races in bold indicate pole position) (Races in italics indicate fastest lap)

Complete Japanese Formula 3000/Formula Nippon results
(key) (Races in bold indicate pole position) (Races in italics indicate fastest lap)

Complete Japanese Formula 3 results
(key) (Races in bold indicate pole position) (Races in italics indicate fastest lap)

Complete All-Japan GT Championship results
(key) (Races in bold indicate pole position) (Races in italics indicate fastest lap)

Complete Japanese Touring Car Championship results

Complete Super Tourenwagen Cup results
(key) (Races in bold indicate pole position) (Races in italics indicate fastest lap)

Complete British Touring Car Championship results
(key) (Races in bold indicate pole position – 1 point awarded all races) (Races in italics indicate fastest lap – 1 point awarded all races) (* signifies that driver lead feature races for at least one lap – 1 point awarded)

Complete Deutsche Tourenwagen Masters results
(key)

1 –  A non-championship one-off race was held in 2004 at the streets of Shanghai, China.
† — Retired, but was classified as he completed 90 per cent of the winner's race distance.

Complete FIA World Endurance Championship results

Other notable results

Notes

External links

 

1967 births
Living people
People from Hobro
Danish racing drivers
International Formula 3000 drivers
Japanese Formula 3000 Championship drivers
Formula Nippon drivers
German Formula Three Championship drivers
Japanese Formula 3 Championship drivers
British Touring Car Championship drivers
Deutsche Tourenwagen Masters drivers
Japanese Touring Car Championship drivers
24 Hours of Le Mans drivers
24 Hours of Le Mans winning drivers
American Le Mans Series drivers
European Le Mans Series drivers
FIA World Endurance Championship drivers
Blancpain Endurance Series drivers
24 Hours of Spa drivers
12 Hours of Sebring drivers
Sportspeople from the North Jutland Region
Karting World Championship drivers
Team Joest drivers
Abt Sportsline drivers
Audi Sport drivers
TOM'S drivers
BMW M drivers
Phoenix Racing drivers
Schnitzer Motorsport drivers